Clitoria ternatea, commonly known as Asian pigeonwings, bluebellvine, blue pea, butterfly pea, cordofan pea or Darwin pea is a plant species belonging to the family Fabaceae, endemic and native to the Indonesian island of Ternate.

In India, it is revered as a holy flower, used in daily puja rituals.

Etymology 
The first reference to the genus, which includes an illustration of the plant, was made in 1678 by Jakób Breyne, a Polish naturalist, who described it as Flos clitoridis ternatensibus, meaning 'Ternatean flower of the clitoris'. Meanwhile on the other hand, the species name is derived from the name of the island where these Linnaeus's specimens originated; which is the Ternate Island located in northern part of the Maluku Islands.

Distribution
This plant is native to equatorial Asia, including locations in South Asia and Southeast Asia but has also been introduced to Africa, Australia and the Americas.

Description
It is a perennial herbaceous plant, with elliptic, obtuse leaves. It grows as a vine or creeper, doing well in moist, neutral soil. 
Its most striking feature is the color of its flowers, a vivid deep blue; solitary, with light yellow markings. Some varieties yield white flowers.

They are edible when tender.

It is grown as an ornamental plant and as a revegetation species (e.g., in coal mines in Australia), requiring little care when cultivated. As a legume, its roots form a symbiotic association with soil bacteria known as rhizobia, which transform atmospheric N2 into a plant-usable form (a process called nitrogen fixing), therefore, this plant is also used to improve soil quality through the decomposition of nitrogen rich plant material.

Cultivation
C. ternatea does not suffer from any severe pest or disease problems.

Pests
Rarely suffers from caterpillars, whiteflies, and spider mites.

Diseases
Suffers from anthracnose and bacterial soft rot. Rarely suffers from fungal root rots.

Uses

Culinary use
In Southeast Asia, the flower is used as a natural food colouring to colour glutinous rice and desserts like the Eurasian putugal as well as an Ayurvedic medicine. In Kelantan, in the north-east of peninsular Malaysia, it is an important ingredient in nasi kerabu, giving it its characteristic bluish colour. In Burmese and Thai cuisines, the flowers are also dipped in butter and fried. It is also used to colour the Nyonya dish Pulot tartal.

Butterfly pea flower tea is made from the ternatea flowers and dried lemongrass and changes color depending on what is added to the liquid, with lemon juice turning it purple. In Thailand and Vietnam, this butterfly blue pea flower tea is commonly mixed with honey and lemon to increase acidity and turn the beverage a pink-purple color, to produce for a drink usually served after dinner, or as a refreshment at hotels and spas. The drink is a typical local drink like chamomile tea is in other parts of the world. The tea is found in both hot and cold varieties

The flowers have more recently been used in a color-changing gin. Blue in the bottle, it turns pink when mixed with a carbonated mixer such as tonic water due to the change in pH. As organic colours are not permanent, this type of gin is recommended to be stored in a dark place to maintain the effect.

Traditional medicine
In traditional Ayurvedic medicine, it is ascribed with various qualities including memory enhancing, nootropic, antistress, anxiolytic, antidepressant, anticonvulsant, tranquilizing, and sedative properties. In traditional Chinese medicine, the plant has been ascribed properties affecting female libido due to its similar appearance to the female reproductive organ. Using its extract have also shown its ability to reduce intensity of behavior caused by serotonin and acetylcholine.

Its extracts possess a wide range of pharmacological activities including antimicrobial, antipyretic, anti-inflammatory, analgesic, diuretic, local anesthetic, antidiabetic, insecticidal, blood platelet aggregation-inhibiting and for use as a vascular smooth muscle relaxing properties.  This plant has a long use in traditional Ayurvedic medicine for several diseases and the scientific studies has reconfirmed those with modern relevance.

Textile use
The flower can be used to dye natural fibers and is used by traditional societies in Asia to do so.

Chemical constituents
Chemical compounds isolated from C. ternatea include various triterpenoids, flavonol glycosides, anthocyanins and steroids.  Cyclic peptides known as cliotides have been isolated from the heat-stable fraction of C. ternatea extract. The blue colour of C. ternatea is a result of various anthocyanins, most importantly ternatins - polyacylated derivatives of delphinidin 3,3', 5'-triglucoside (Da-T).

Gallery

References

External links

 
 
A strain of Clitoria ternatea from the Philippines from the Int'l Soc. for Taxonomic Explorations by Isidro A. T. Savillo.

ternatea
Flora of Thailand
Flora of India (region)
Flora of Malesia
Forages
Flora of Nepal
Nitrogen-fixing crops
Plants described in 1753
Taxa named by Carl Linnaeus